Swargarani School is a school in Rajarajeshwarinagar, Bangalore. It is an English medium co-educational school affiliated to the Indian Council of Secondary Education (ICSE) of the Indian government.

Location

It is located right opposite Shakthi Hill Resort in BEML Layout 5th Stage in Rajarajeshwari Nagar, Bangalore.  It is around 3 km from the arch on Mysore Road.

External links
Official site

High schools and secondary schools in Bangalore